Oskar Engelhard von Löwis of Menar (5 April 1838–6 August 1899) was a Baltic German ornithologist.

Life and work
He was born in present-day Valmiera District, Latvia (then part of the Russian Empire). He studied physics and economy in Tartu and worked as a public official in different capacities. An avid hunter and ornithologist, he was a member of the Riga Association of Natural Scientists (Der Naturforscherverein zu Riga), predecessor of the Natural History Museum of Latvia from 1878. He contributed to several publications on the bird-life in Latvia, and wrote three books on the subject. Among these is the first book about birds in the Latvian language.

Selected works
 Die Reptilien Kur-, Liv- und Estlands: ein Handbüchlein für alle Naturfreunde in Stadt und Land. Riga: N. Kymmel's Buchhandlung, 1884
 Ievērojamākie Baltijas putni. Rīga: Ernsts Plates, 1893 (in Latvian)
 Unsere Baltischen Singvögel. Reval: Franz Kluge, 1895
 Diebe und Käuber in der Baltischen Vogelwelt. Riga: Deubner, 1898

References

1838 births
1899 deaths
Baltic-German people
German ornithologists